= Game publisher =

Game publisher may refer to:

- Card game publisher
- Board game publisher
- Video game publisher
